Michael Seidenbecher (born ) is a German track cyclist, riding for the national team. He competed at the 2006, 2007, 2008 and 2010 UCI Track Cycling World Championships.

References

External links
 Profile at cyclingarchives.com

1984 births
Living people
German track cyclists
German male cyclists
Place of birth missing (living people)
People from Bezirk Erfurt
Sportspeople from Erfurt
Cyclists from Thuringia
21st-century German people